Sir Edward Peter Kemp, KCB (10 October 1934 – 24 June 2008), commonly known as Peter Kemp, was an English civil servant. An early career in the Royal Navy was cut short by illness and he followed this up with work as an accountant. Kemp entered the civil service in 1967; promoted to deputy secretary at HM Treasury in 1983, in 1988 he was made Second Permanent Secretary at in the Office of the Minister for the Civil Service at the Cabinet Office (in 1992, this became the Office of Public Service and Science); in the role, he had responsibility for implementing the Next Steps reforms which separated administrative and policy work from delivery by creating government agencies. He left the civil service in 1992.

References 

1934 births
2008 deaths
English civil servants
English accountants
Royal Navy officers
Knights Companion of the Order of the Bath